The Pearson Electra is an American trailerable sailboat that was designed by Carl Alberg as a Midget Ocean Racing Club (MORC) racer and first built in 1960.

The Electra design was developed into the Pearson Ensign in 1962, primarily by enlarging the cockpit and shrinking the cabin. The two boats share the same hull design.

Production
The Electra was the second design built by Pearson Yachts. A total of 350 examples were completed before production ended.

Design
The Electra is a recreational keelboat, built predominantly of fiberglass, with wood trim. It has a masthead sloop rig, a spooned raked stem, a raised reverse transom, a keel-mounted rudder controlled by a tiller and a fixed long keel. It displaces  and carries  of ballast.

The design has sleeping accommodation for four people, with a double "V"-berth in the bow cabin and two straight settee berths in the main cabin. The head is located in the bow cabin under the "V"-berth.

Operational history
The boat is supported by an active class club, the Pearson Yachts Portal.

In a 2010 review Steve Henkel wrote, "this early fiberglass Alberg design was introduced the year after the ground-breaking 29-foot Pearson Triton hit the ways in 1959, and was one of the very first small fiberglass cruising sailboats. In those days the marketers weren't always sure what the market would bear, so the Electra at first was sold as a basic two-berth overnighter, with extra cost options that would make her a full-fledged cruiser (forward berths, galley, icebox, toilet, etc.). The Pearson Ensign 22, a weekend version using the same hull but featuring a larger cockpit and smaller cabin, followed in 1962, and turned out to be much more popular than the Electra. Best features: The Electra, being a near clone of the Ensign, has many of the same stats, which make her relatively fast for her day (though definitely not faster relative to more recent designs). Some say she is better looking than many of the cruisers in her size range. Worst features: Compared to the Hunter 22, her comp[etitor] other than the Ensign, she generally has less headroom. Her draft is deep enough for casual racing, but wouldn't stand up to many deeper-draft keelboats or shallower boats with centerboards (unless her extremely high PHRF rating could be brought to bear)."

See also
List of sailing boat types

Related development
Pearson Ensign

Similar sailboats
Alberg 22
Cape Dory 22
Capri 22
Catalina 22
CS 22
DS-22
Edel 665
Falmouth Cutter 22
Hunter 22
J/22
Marlow-Hunter 22
Marshall 22
Nonsuch 22
Santana 22
Seaward 22
Spindrift 22
Starwind 223
Tanzer 22
US Yachts US 22

References

Keelboats
1960s sailboat type designs
Sailing yachts
Trailer sailers
Sailboat types built in the United States
Sailboat type designs by Carl Alberg
Sailboat types built by Pearson Yachts